The Faudel-Phillips Baronetcy, of Grosvenor Gardens in the Parish of St George Hanover Square in the County of London and of Queen's Gardens, West Brighton, in the County of Sussex, was a title in the Baronetage of the United Kingdom. It was created on 27 August 1897 for George Faudel-Phillips, Sheriff of London and Middlesex between 1884 and 1885, High Sheriff of the County of London between 1895 and 1896 and Lord Mayor of London between 1896 and 1897. Born George Phillips, he had assumed the additional surname of Faudel, which was that of his maternal uncle. His father Sir Benjamin Samuel Phillips had been Lord Mayor of London between 1865 and 1866. The title became extinct on the death of the 3rd Baronet in 1941. Their families were emigrants from Germany, Poland, and possibly other countries, and had settled in England in the 1700s and 1800s.

All three holders of the title served as High Sheriff of Hertfordshire.

Sir Lionel Lawson Faudel Faudel-Phillips, 3rd Baronet was the great-great-grandfather of model and actress Cara Delevingne (Sir Lionel's daughter with Armyne Evelyn Gordon, Ann Margaret Faudel-Phillips, was the mother of Cara's maternal grandmother) and her sister Poppy Delevingne.

Faudel-Phillips baronets, of Grosvenor Gardens and Queen's Gardens (1897)

Sir George Faudel Faudel-Phillips, GCIE, 1st Baronet (1840–1922), married to Helen Levy
Sir Benjamin Samuel Faudel-Phillips, 2nd Baronet (1871–1927)
Sir Lionel Lawson Faudel Faudel-Phillips, 3rd Baronet (1877–1941), married to Armyne Evelyn Gordon, of Scottish, English and some Irish ancestry, daughter of Lord Granville Armyne Gordon (14 June 1856 – 14 June 1907), son of the 10th Marquess of Huntly Chief of Clan Gordon, and wife (4 September 1878) married Charlotte D'Olier Roe (died 28 May 1900)

References

Further reading
 

Extinct baronetcies in the Baronetage of the United Kingdom
British Jewish families
British Ashkenazi Jews